Qina Qina (Aymara qina qina an Andean cane flute, also meaning 'full of holes', also spelled Khena Khena) is a mountain in the Bolivian Andes which reaches a height of approximately . It is located in the Cochabamba Department, Quillacollo Province, Quillacollo Municipality, at the border of the Morochata Municipality.

References 

Mountains of Cochabamba Department